Alvin Rabushka (born May 15, 1940) is an American political scientist. He is a David and Joan Traitel Senior Fellow at the Hoover Institution at Stanford University, and member of the Mont Pelerin Society. He is best known for his work on taxation and transition economies. Together with Robert Hall, he wrote a detailed flat tax plan known as the Hall–Rabushka flat tax.

Publications
 Taxation in Colonial America. Princeton, NJ: Princeton University Press, 2008. 
 Politics in Plural Societies: A Theory of Democratic Instability 
 From Predation to Prosperity: How to Move from Socialism to Markets (October 20, 2008)
 Fixing Russia's Banks: A Proposal for Growth. Hoover Institution Press, 2013. 
 The Flat Tax

References
 Rabushka's home page at Stanford
 Rabushka's bio at Washington University in St. Louis
 Rabushka's bio at the Hoover Institution

External links
 an interview with Alvin Rabushka (Sast Report)
 The Flat Tax, by Robert Hall and Alvin Rabushka (full text from the Hoover Institution)
 
 
 

1940 births
Living people
21st-century American economists
Hoover Institution people
Cato Institute people
Economics writers
Member of the Mont Pelerin Society